Le Gourmet Chef was a high-end American consumer retail company specializing in gourmet foods and kitchenware products. It was a subsidiary of Kitchen Collection, owned by NACCO Industries. Le Gourmet Chef is headquartered in Chillicothe, Ohio.

History
Le Gourmet Chef, Inc. was founded in 1988. On August 8, 2006 it filed for Chapter 11 bankruptcy protection. The company was acquired by Kitchen Collection on August 28, 2006.

Kitchen Collection liquidation 
On October 15th, 2019, Kitchen Collection, which was a parent of Le Gourmet Chef, announced that it would close all 160 of its stores by the end of 2019.

References

External links
 

Retail companies of the United States
Companies based in Cleveland
American companies established in 1988
Food and drink companies established in 1988
Retail companies established in 1988